Pretty Paper is the first Christmas album and 24th studio album by country singer Willie Nelson. It was also his last release of the 1970s. Nelson reunited with producer/arranger Booker T. Jones, with whom he had collaborated on the acclaimed Stardust album released the year before.

The self-composed title track had been a hit Christmas song in 1963, when it was recorded by Roy Orbison. Nelson had previously recorded the song in 1964.

Track listing

Side one
"White Christmas" (Irving Berlin) – 2:45
"Winter Wonderland" (Felix Bernard, Richard B. Smith) – 2:25
"Rudolph the Red-Nosed Reindeer" (Johnny Marks) – 2:11
"Jingle Bells" (James Pierpont) – 2:11
"Here Comes Santa Claus" (Gene Autry, Oakley Haldeman) – 1:53
"Blue Christmas" (Billy Hayes, Jay Johnson) – 2:38

Side two
"Santa Claus Is Coming to Town" (J. Fred Coots, Haven Gillespie) – 2:12
"Frosty the Snowman" (Steve Nelson, Jack Rollins) – 2:25 
"Silent Night" (Joseph Mohr, Franz Xavier Gruber) – 3:43
"Little Town of Bethlehem" (Phillips Brooks. Lewis H. Redner) – 1:28
"Christmas Blues" – Instrumental (Willie Nelson, Booker T. Jones) – 3:13
"Pretty Paper" (Willie Nelson) – 2:25

Personnel 
Willie Nelson – Vocals, guitar
Paul English – Drums
Chris Ethridge – Bass
Bradley Hartman – Engineer
Booker T. Jones – Arranger, Keyboards
Rex Ludwick – Drums
Jody Payne – Guitar
Mickey Raphael – Harmonica
Bee Spears – Bass

Certifications

References 

Willie Nelson albums
Albums produced by Booker T. Jones
Christmas albums by American artists
Columbia Records Christmas albums
1979 Christmas albums
Country Christmas albums